Wexelsen is a surname. Notable people with the surname include:

Håkon Wexelsen (1898–1979), Norwegian plant geneticist
Håkon Wexelsen Freihow (born 1927), Norwegian diplomat
Halvdan Wexelsen Freihow (1883–1965), Norwegian priest and culturist
Marie Wexelsen (1832–1911), Norwegian poet, children's writer and novelist
Vilhelm Andreas Wexelsen (1849–1909), Norwegian bishop and politician for the Liberal Party